The First Lady of Mato Grosso do Sul is the title used by the wives of the governor of Mato Grosso do Sul, Brazil. The first to hold the position was Amélia Santana, wife of the first governor Harry Amorim Costa. The current First Lady of Mato Grosso do Sul is Mônica Riedel, wife of Eduardo Riedel.

Generally, the first ladies of Mato Grosso do Sul, in addition to serving as hostess of the state and accompanying the governor to events, engage in activism and support public causes to benefit the state's population.

First ladies
 Amélia Santana
 Maria Antonina Cançado Soares
 Ilda Salgado
 Maria Aparecida Pedrossian
 Nelly Martins
 Fairte Tebet
 Maria Antonina Cançado Soares
 Maria Aparecida Pedrossian
 Nelly Martins
 Gilda Gomes
 Elisabeth Maria Machado
 Fátima Azambuja
 Mônica Riedel

References

See also
 List of governors of Mato Grosso do Sul

Mato Grosso do Sul